Schooner Gulch may refer to:

 Schooner Gulch State Beach
 Schooner Gulch, California, a former populated place